Franchot is a surname of French origin. It may refer to:

 Charles-Louis-Félix Franchot (1809–1881), French designer and inventor .

Nicholas Van Vranken Franchot (1855–1943), New York Superintendent of Public Works
Nicholas V. V. Franchot II (1884–1938), New York assemblyman
Peter Franchot (born 1947), Maryland Comptroller
Richard Franchot (1816–1875), U.S. Representative from New York, Union Army officer
Stanislaus P. Franchot (1851–1908), New York state senator

See also
 Franchot Tone (Stanislaus Pascal Franchot Tone, 1905–1968), American actor